Gani is both a given name and a surname. Notable people with the name include:

Given name
Gani Bobi (1943–1995), Albanian philosopher and sociologist
Gani Fawehinmi (1938–2009), Nigerian writer
Gani Lawal (born 1988), Nigerian-American basketball player
Gani Mirzo (born 1968), Kurdish musician
Gani Zhailauov (born 1985), Kazakhstani boxer
Gani Desku (born 2004), famous baller and jazz player

Surname
Adnan Kapau Gani (1905–1968), Indonesian politician
Lenin Gani (1967–2013), Bangladeshi journalist
R. A. Gani, Bangladeshi politician
Sakibul Gani, Indian cricketer